Aleš Gorza (born 20 July 1980) is a retired Slovenian alpine skier.

Gorza represented Slovenia at the 2006 Winter Olympics.  His World Cup debut was on 21 December 2001 in Kranjska Gora. His best results so far are two 3rd places in Super-G, one in Whistler, British Columbia and in Bormio, Italy, in 2008.

He retired in 2012 after being dropped from Slovenian national ski team.

World Cup results

Season standings

Race podiums

References 

1980 births
Living people
Sportspeople from Slovenj Gradec
Slovenian male alpine skiers
Alpine skiers at the 2006 Winter Olympics
Alpine skiers at the 2010 Winter Olympics
Olympic alpine skiers of Slovenia